Tim Field (24 April 1952 in Eastbourne – 15 January 2006) was a British anti-bullying activist with his main focus relating to workplace bullying. He was the author of two books. In 2011, Field and a journalist Neil Marr coined the term "bullycide".

Early life
Tim Field was born on 24 April 1952 in Eastbourne, England. From 1971 to 1975 he studied computing science in Stafford at the North Staffordshire Polytechnic, now Staffordshire University, and was awarded a First Class Honours degree.

Career
Field worked in the computer industry for nineteen years until he had to stop due to the effects of experiencing severe workplace bullying.

In 1996, Field founded the UK National Workplace Bullying Advice Line and the Success Unlimited website. He wrote and self-published a book, Bully in Sight, based on his own experiences, and impressions of calls to the advice line in 1996. First published with the long title Bully in Sight: How to Predict, Resist, Challenge and Combat Workplace Bullying, the first ten chapters of the book seek to define bullying and bullies. The second part offers suggestions on how to challenge and combat workplace bullying.

As a result of the expense and effort of defending himself against a libel action, in early 2004, Field closed down the National Workplace Bullying Advice Line and Bullying Times.

Personal life, death and legacy
In July 1978 Field married Susan Mitchener, who he had met as a fellow-student at N. Staffs. Polytechnic. They had two children.

Field died from cancer on 15 January 2006, aged 53.

Tim Field set up bullyonline.org to inform people about workplace bullying.  In 2015 the Tim Field Foundation was established as a UK registered charity to maintain this website and further Tim Field's cause against bullying.

Works

References

External links
 Vaknin, Sam, Bully at Work - Interview with Tim Field
 Tim Field Memorial site

1952 births
2006 deaths
Anti-bullying activists
Academics and writers on bullying
Workplace bullying
Alumni of Staffordshire University
Deaths from cancer in England
English computer scientists